The United States Veterans' Affairs Subcommittee on Economic Opportunity is one of the four subcommittees within the House Veterans' Affairs Committee.

Jurisdiction
From the House Rules:
Subcommittee on Economic Opportunity, which shall have legislative, oversight and investigative jurisdiction over education of veterans, employment and training of veterans, vocational rehabilitation, veterans’ housing programs, readjustment of servicemembers to civilian life, and servicemembers civil relief.

Members, 117th Congress

Historical membership rosters

115th Congress

116th Congress

External links
Subcommittee page

Veterans' Affairs Economic Opportunity